Dimitrios Moutas (born 15 April 1968) is a Greek former professional footballer who played as a forward.

References

External links
 

1968 births
Living people
German people of Greek descent
Sportspeople of Greek descent
Citizens of Greece through descent
Footballers from Stuttgart
Greek footballers
German footballers
Association football forwards
Mediterranean Games gold medalists for Greece
Mediterranean Games medalists in football
Competitors at the 1991 Mediterranean Games
1. FC Pforzheim players
SC Freiburg players
Stuttgarter Kickers players
VfL Bochum players
OFI Crete F.C. players
Kavala F.C. players
Panelefsiniakos F.C. players
Ethnikos Piraeus F.C. players
Fostiras F.C. players
Ethnikos Asteras F.C. players
Bundesliga players
2. Bundesliga players
Super League Greece players
Greek football managers
Ethnikos Piraeus F.C. managers
Acharnaikos F.C. managers
Kallithea F.C. managers